The Legend of Vox Machina is an American adult animated fantasy television series produced by Metapigeon, Titmouse, Inc., and Amazon Studios, which premiered on Amazon Prime Video on January 28, 2022. The series is based on the first campaign of the Dungeons & Dragons web series Critical Role. It stars Laura Bailey, Taliesin Jaffe, Ashley Johnson, Matthew Mercer, Liam O'Brien, Marisha Ray, Sam Riegel, and Travis Willingham, reprising their roles from the campaign.

The first season consists of twelve episodes, the first ten of which were funded via a Kickstarter campaign. In November 2019, ahead of the series premiere, it was renewed by Amazon for a second season which premiered on January 20, 2023. On October 6, 2022, ahead of season two's premiere, Amazon renewed the series for a third season.

Premise

Setting
The series is set in Exandria, a fictional world created by Matthew Mercer in 2012 for his personal Dungeons & Dragons campaign which then launched as the actual play web series Critical Role in 2015. Most of the story takes place on the continent of Tal'Dorei in locations such as the metropolis of Emon and the city-state of Whitestone.

Synopsis
The first two episodes of the series depict "an all-new story about the seven-member Vox Machina team at D&D Level 7 on their first 'grown-up' mission, which occurs prior to Critical Role's first RPG show". The series then adapts the Briarwood arc from the original web series, "in which the Vox Machina crew avenge the murder of the rulers of the town of Whitestone and most of their offspring by the evil Lord and Lady Briarwood". In the second season the series also adapts "other classic Vox Machina story arcs", such as the Chroma Conclave arc.

Cast and characters

 Laura Bailey as Vex'ahlia "Vex" Vessar: a member of Vox Machina, and the twin sister of Vax'ildan. She is a half-elf ranger who has studied dragons in the hope of eventually finding the one that killed her mother. Vex feels a pain in her head whenever a dragon is close by.
 Taliesin Jaffe as Percival "Percy" Fredrickstein Von Musel Klossowski de Rolo III: a member of Vox Machina and a human gunslinger. Percy's family were once the rulers of Whitestone – a city within Tal'Dorei. He barely escaped alive from a coup d'état led by the Briarwoods, and sought vengeance for the murder of his family during the first season. Jaffe also voices Percy's father, Lord Frederick de Rolo.
 Ashley Johnson as Pike Trickfoot: a member of Vox Machina and a gnome cleric of the goddess Everlight.
 Matthew Mercer as Trinket: A grizzly bear who serves as Vex's pet and companion. Mercer also voices the vampire Lord Sylas Briarwood, the shadow demon Orthax, the black dragon Umbrasyl, and various other background characters throughout the series. A character based on Mercer's likeness appears in every episode of the show as an easter egg.
 Liam O'Brien as Vax'ildan "Vax" Vessar: a member of Vox Machina, and the twin brother of Vex'ahlia. He is a half-elf rogue. The mother of Vex and Vax was killed by a dragon before the events of the series. O'Brien also voices the white dragon Vorugal. 
 Marisha Ray as Keyleth of the Air Ashari: a member of Vox Machina and a half-elf druid. She is currently undergoing her Aramenté – a quest which acts as the Ashari trial of leadership.
 Sam Riegel as Scanlan Shorthalt: a member of Vox Machina and a gnome bard.
 Travis Willingham as Grog Strongjaw: a member of Vox Machina and a goliath barbarian.

Episodes

Series overview

Season 1 (2022)

Season 2 (2023)

Development

Kickstarter
On March 4, 2019, the Critical Role cast launched a Kickstarter campaign to raise funds for a 22-minute animation called Critical Role: The Legend of Vox Machina Animated Special. The animated story was to be set just before the streaming portion of the campaign started—when the players were around level seven—during a time when, canonically, there is an in-game period of roughly six months when the members of Vox Machina were not all together at the same time. The cast projected a cost of US$750,000 for a single 22-minute animated short, fulfilling the other campaign rewards, and the fees associated with a crowdfunding campaign. Not knowing how long this would take to raise, the campaign length was set at 45 days.

Within an hour of launch, the Kickstarter had reached more than $1,000,000. At the end of the first full day, all of the announced stretch goals had been unlocked, and the total had reached more than $4.3 million. With four 22-minute episodes funded in the first 24 hours, additional stretch goals were added, expanding the project into an animated series. The first two episodes would cover the pre-stream story arc. The subsequent episodes would adapt the Briarwoods' arc, also from the Vox Machina campaign. By March 18, 2019, eight 22-minute episodes had been funded. Finally, on April 4, 2019, the last published stretch goal of $8.8 million was reached during the airing of episode 57 of campaign two, pushing the total length of the animated series to ten episodes. A "secret" $10M stretch goal of Willingham being filmed going around a haunted house was reached April 16. The final total raised by the Kickstarter when it closed on April 19, 2019, was $11,385,449 with 88,887 backers. When the campaign closed, it was one of the most quickly funded in Kickstarter history, and was the most funded Kickstarter for TV and film projects.

Production
The Critical Role cast reprise their respective Vox Machina roles, with the exception of Orion Acaba. The animated series was written by Jennifer Muro and others with Brandon Auman as the showrunner; the series was animated by Titmouse, Inc with character design by Phil Bourassa and other animation renderings by South Korea's Production Reve. Willingham told Inverse that "it took outsider perspectives to make the stories they told in tabletop comprehensible for newcomers and fresh for existing fans"; Willingham said that "the Briarwood Arc was around 35 hours. We had to squish that down into about six". The music for the series was primarily composed by Neal Acree, with Sam Riegel and Mr. Fantastic contributing to Scanlan's songs.

In November 2019, Amazon Studios announced that they had acquired the streaming rights to The Legend of Vox Machina, and had commissioned 14 additional episodes (two additional episodes for season 1 and a second season of 12 episodes). The cast went with Amazon as it "gave them the most freedom" in developing the show such as keeping it as an adult animation project. Ray, in an interview with Polygon, said "we lucked out with Amazon. There were other potential distributors that we were talking about that were more interested in making it maybe a children's show, or wanting to go a different direction, or [make it into a] more serious political fantasy, a la Game of Thrones". The project was originally slated for release in late 2020; however, in June 2020, it was announced that the debut would be missed due to the COVID-19 pandemic. The release was delayed to 2022.

A number of the Kickstarter tiers offered production credits. Backers at the $2,500 and higher tiers were given a "crowd funding associate producer" credit in the end credits of the first ten episodes of season one. Those who pledged more than $20,000 were listed as "crowd funding executive producer".

Broadcast
An update posted to the Kickstarter campaign in 2019 assured backers they would have free access to the first season. In January 2022, Critical Role announced that Kickstarter backers would have free early access to the first two episodes from January 25 to 27. To access the first season, Kickstarter backers would need either an Amazon Prime subscription or would need to register for a free trial of Amazon Prime.

The first season premiered on January 28, 2022, on Amazon Prime Video; the soundtrack for the first season premiered the same day digitally. The second season premiered on January 20, 2023. As with the first season; the second season was released in batches of three episodes per week, for a total of twelve episodes.

Reception

Pre-release
Multiple outlets, such as Variety, the Los Angeles Times, and CNBC, reported that the Kickstarter became the largest one for Film & Video, surpassing the previous record holder Mystery Science Theater 3000, with total funding of more than $11.3 million from more than 88,000 backers. Variety highlighted that "Critical Role started working on the project in the spring of 2018. [...] After getting snubbed by Hollywood, CR decided to take a crack at bringing the project to life on Kickstarter. [...] Critical Role knew they had a big and engaged fanbase but the team didn't expect the flood of pledges that has poured in. On Twitch, between 30,000–40,000 people typically watch live with another 150,000 views on-demand, according to Willingham. The episodes on YouTube typically hit around 250,000 views in the first 24 hours. All told, each episode garners around 1 million views". The Los Angeles Times highlighted that the Kickstarter bested "bigger-name properties like 'Mystery Science Theater 3000,' revived by Netflix in 2017, and 'Veronica Mars,' which became a feature film [...]. Critical Role has evolved into a mini media empire, attracting more than half a million viewers every week to YouTube, Twitch and their own site, Critrole.com. The friends have transformed their homegrown characters into a top 10 comic book on Comixology; sell out their live shows; and draw lines around the block at comic book stores and convention signings. The Amazon deal follows a partnership with the animation studio Titmouse".

Cori McCreery, for WWAC, highlighted that Orion Acaba and his character would not appear in the animated series. She wrote, "Part of the beauty of adaptations is that you can change things that no longer fit the story you want to tell. The Critical Role team had a falling out with the actor who played Tiberius, and the character wound up leaving the game pretty early on into the stream, and leaving a bit of a conundrum for adaptations like this and the upcoming cartoon. [...] So while I don't know if they're writing the character out in the comics earlier than he left the game, I do know that they do not plan to use him in the animated series, despite his being present for some of the adventures there. I'd be perfectly fine if this adaptation took a page from the medium it's part of and provides everyone with a retcon of the group's past".

Critical response
The first six out of twelve episodes of the first season were given to critics to review ahead of the series premiere. The first season of The Legend of Vox Machina received a generally positive response from critics. . Multiple reviews highlighted the challenges in adapting the lengthy source material and that the show has some pacing issues, however, once it reaches the Briarwood arc the show takes off. According to market research company Parrot Analytics, the first season was the most in-demand animated streaming television show in the first-quarter of 2022, and that the show had "17.9 times the average demand of all other U.S. series".

In comparing the first season to the original D&D campaign, Glen Weldon of NPR stated that "The Legend of Vox Machina is what's left over, after all of that chaos energy has been distilled into pure story. Distilled, and greatly condensed: Storylines that stretched over hours and hours on the web series play out, here, over the course of one or two half-hour episodes. [...] The animated series can't be everything the web series is, but then, it's aiming for a wider audience. And at that respect at least, its certainly got everything it needs to hit its target". Kevin Johnson, for The A.V. Club, stated that "the action is well-animated, and while this is indeed an adult show—with plenty of curse words, sexual innuendo, and brutal violence—nothing feels overwhelmingly crass or unnecessarily gratuitous. When things do escalate, it matters. In particular, the fourth episode is a sharp showcase of nuanced character beats, nerve-racking tension, and horrifyingly, putrid visuals. It's good stuff, and perhaps most importantly, Vox Machina knows to let its moments–dramatic, comedic, or action-oriented–breathe for themselves". Kenneth Lowe, for Paste, highlighted how the show is not a 1980s kids show à la the 1983 Dungeons & Dragons television series; instead, it has a similar level of graphic violence as Amazon's Invincible. Lowe wrote that "if you wanted a show about D&D with the serial numbers filed off, it's got you covered. [...] While there isn't a whole lot of diversity in the principal Critical Role cast, the show comes down on the side of a kind of casual inclusivity, appearing [...], to studiously avoid the racial essentialism which forms more of the bedrock of tabletop roleplaying gaming than many like to admit. [...] The Legend of Vox Machina is a competently produced story decidedly informed by the sensibilities of a new generation of players".

Eric Francisco, for Inverse, compared the show to Avatar: The Last Airbender and Voltron in the way it conveys ideas; he stated that The Legend of Vox Machina "effortlessly turns complicated lore into broadly accessible ideas. Of minor consequence is there's not enough originality in Tal'Dorei itself [...]. That's not to say there isn't gravitas to Vox Machina; the story of Percy, the gunslinger who wrestles against his lust for revenge, is astonishing to witness. But the lines differentiating comedy and parody blurs too often, especially at how frequently the show flips its tones. Despite its sourcing from a long-running Twitch show, The Legend of Vox Machina stands as an accessible thing by itself. At its heart, Vox Machina is an action fantasy, only unusual in its marriage of Tolkien-lite settings and the lurid humor of a Deadpool comic book". Cass Marshall, for Polygon, described the show as "a deeply indulgent story", "weirdly wholesome", and at times "frankly a little much". Marshall wrote, "I love it. Critical Role's heart and good intentions overcame a lot of the initial problems with The Legend of Vox Machina, and by the time the season's major arc kicked off I was fully invested. The animation carries the plot quite well, albeit not perfectly. [...] This is D&D pulp at its best, and luckily, you don't need to delve into the rich canon of Critical Role and its associated projects".

Subsequent seasons 

Rotten Tomatoes reported that 100% of critics gave the second season a positive review with an average rating of 8.10/10, based on 17 reviews. The website's consensus reads, "double the dosage of dragons along with swashbuckling antics, The Legend of Vox Machina's sophomore season goes from strength to strength as a richly imagined adventure tale". Shannon O'Connor, for The Daily Beast, stated that "the first season of Vox Machina was an absolute blast, but Season 2 expands on it in the best possible way". O'Connor highlighted the voice cast who add "so much depth, creativity and fun to these characters". O'Connor commented that the show plays with audience expectations around fantasy tropes and that the show is not only a good adaptation but also an "uproarious, heartening, thrilling animated series in its own right". Anna Govert, for Paste, stated that the 12 episode second season is a "masterclass of adaptation" as it is based on "over 80 hours of tabletop gameplay" – the series is "unafraid of making changes and knowing the importance of character-first storytelling". Govert commented that The Legend of Vox Machina's "commitment to telling [...] meaningful stories alongside its badass fight sequences and crude humor make it feel refreshing and unique still in its second outing". She called the second season "a visual delight" with "an even clearer anime influence and a style that feels uniquely Vox Machina". Petrana Radulovic, for Polygon, commented that the "Dungeons & Dragons roots" are felt more in the second season as the characters go on a quest to acquire different objects. Radulovic highlighted that the show "might not fully gel for everyone" due to its expansive cast, huge amount of lore and raunchy comedic moments, however, "there is so much heart and fun in the grandiose adventure" which makes it special "for those it does click for". She also stated that animation is a better visual medium for fantasy – "Keyleth's elemental magic, Pike's glowing healing powers, and Scanlan's bright pink and purple bardic conjurations are really a testament to why we should see more of these shows in animation". James Grebey, for Vulture, wrote that splitting the party can be difficult in a role-playing game, however, by doing this in the adaptation "it has the benefit of being scripted and better suited to telling concurrent, coherent storylines than a harried DM" and it leads to "a trio of episodes that feel especially coherent and effective". Grebey commented that Grog and Scanlan can be "a lot, especially when their antics feel degrees sillier than whatever sad emo boy thing Vax or Percy are doing. I don't mean to keep harping on this, but the improvised, actual-play format of Critical Role supports these jarring moments of comedy better than the TV show [...]. But, when the two are on their own [...] it makes for a very effective story. It's all a little sillier but in a tonally consistent way, and being on their own forces the comic relief characters to step up and mature a little bit while still having the ability to pull off a pretty great suppository joke".

Other media
 The Legend of Vox Machina is an adaptation of the first campaign of the web series Critical Role. "The first campaign lasted 115 episodes, with each video lasting between three- and six-hours long".
 The comic series Critical Role: Vox Machina Origins is an adaptation of the group's game before the show.
 The novel Critical Role: Vox Machina – Kith & Kin (2021) is a prequel adaptation which focuses on backstory of the twins, Vex and Vax, three years before they joined the adventuring party Vox Machina.
 The campaign sourcebook, Critical Role: Tal'Dorei Campaign Setting (2017), is a guide to the setting of campaign one. It was published by Critical Role and Green Ronin Publishing under the Wizards of the Coast Open Game License and is not considered "official" Dungeons & Dragons material. The book is now out of print — a revised edition, titled Tal'Dorei Campaign Setting Reborn (2022), was released by Darrington Press. The revised edition reflects the twenty year progression of time between campaign one and campaign two.
 The Legend of Vox Machina: Whitestone Chronicles is an upcoming interconnected prequel graphic novel series for The Legend of Vox Machina which will be written by Marieke Nijkamp with art by Tyler Walpole. The series was announced by Dark Horse in February 2023; the first book, The Legend of Vox Machina: Whitestone Chronicles—Ripley, is scheduled to published in 2024.

Notes

References

External links

 
 The Legend of The Legend of Vox Machina video series (via Critical Role's YouTube channel)

2020s American adult animated television series
2020s American LGBT-related animated television series
2022 American television series debuts
Amazon Prime Video original programming
American adult animated action television series
American adult animated adventure television series
American adult animated comedy television series
American adult animated drama television series
American adult animated fantasy television series
Animated television series by Amazon Studios
Anime-influenced Western animated television series
Critical Role
English-language television shows
Kickstarter-funded television series
Television series by Amazon Studios
Television shows based on role-playing games
Vampires in animated television
Witchcraft in television
Works based on Dungeons & Dragons